Łasin  is a town in Grudziądz County, Kuyavian-Pomeranian Voivodeship, Poland, with 3,271 inhabitants (2004). It is the seat of the gmina (administrative district) called Gmina Łasin. It is located within the historic Chełmno Land.

History 

The history of Łasin dates back to the rule of First Polish King Bolesław I the Brave. Polish brothers Mateusz and Jakub owned land near the Łasinka River (Łasin). In the year 1298, it was taken from them by the Country Master of the Teutonic Order Meinhard von Querfurt and given to Jan de Nemore, who founded the village of Łasin. Also in 1298, the town received German Magdeburg law city rights from the monastic state of the Teutonic Knights in which it was located.

In 1454, King Casimir IV Jagiellon reincorporated the Chełmno Land into the Kingdom of Poland upon the request of the Prussian Confederation, however, Łasin itself was captured by Poles in 1461 during the subsequent Thirteen Years' War. After the war, in 1466, the Teutonic Knights renounced claims to the town, and recognized it as part of Poland. Administratively it was located in the Chełmno Voivodeship of Royal Prussia in the Greater Poland Province of the Polish Crown.

Following the First Partition of Poland in 1772, the town, as Lessen, was annexed by King Frederick the Great and made part of the Kingdom of Prussia. In 1871, with the Prussian-led unification of Germany, it became part of the German Empire. It belonged to the Graudenz district in the Prussian Province of West Prussia. According to the census of 1871, the town had a population of 2,385, of which 1,390 (58.3%) were Poles.

After the end of World War I, in 1920, in accordance with the Treaty of Versailles, Łasin became part of the Second Polish Republic, after it regained independence in 1918. In interwar Poland, the mayor of Łasin was Stefan Tomczyński, a Polish activist and efficient administrator, who was previously harassed by Prussians for pro-Polish activity in the Prussian Partition.

During the German occupation of Poland (World War II), in October 1939, the Selbstschutz carried out several mass executions of Polish inhabitants of Łasin and its surroundings, killing 150 people.

Culture
A museum dedicated to firefighting (Muzeum Pożarnictwa Ziemi Pomorskiej) is located in Łasin.

Sports
Piast Łasin sports club is based in Łasin, with football, table tennis and powerlifting sections.

Gallery

Notable people
Zbigniew Dębski (1922–2010), Polish military officer, member of the Home Army and participant of the Warsaw Uprising
Heiner Stadler (1942–2018), jazz composer and musician

References

Cities and towns in Kuyavian-Pomeranian Voivodeship
Grudziądz County